Sabah People's United Front or in Malay Parti Bersatu Rakyat Jelata Sabah is more commonly known by its abbreviation BERJAYA, was a political party based in the state of Sabah, Malaysia. BERJAYA was formed by former United Sabah National Organisation (USNO) secretary-general Harris Salleh who was later joined by Fuad Stephens, who served as the first Chief Minister of Sabah as well as president of the United Pasokmomogun Kadazan Organisation (UPKO). Stephens became the fifth Chief Minister after BERJAYA won the 1976 state election in April but died in June the same year, being succeeded by Salleh. The party had been a partner of Barisan Nasional (BN), the then ruling coalition of Malaysia since its inception on 15 July 1975.

BERJAYA governed the state of Sabah for 8 years from 1976 to 1985 after it managed to win the 1976 state election and oust USNO, Fuad was installed as Sabah's fifth Chief Minister, his second time holding the post. He replaced Mohammad Said Keruak of USNO. However, barely 44 days after becoming Chief Minister, Fuad died in a plane crash in Kota Kinabalu on 6 June 1976, known as the Double Six Tragedy. Along with him, several other state ministers also perished. Harris then took over his post, becoming the sixth Chief Minister of Sabah.

In the 1981 state election, BERJAYA again won, this time with an overwhelming majority. They won 44 out of 48 seats contested. In 1984, party member Joseph Pairin Kitingan left the party to form Parti Bersatu Sabah (PBS). This newly formed party defeated BERJAYA in the 1985 state election.

In the 1990 state election, BERJAYA's support has evidently dwindled as they failed to win a single seat in the election and it was ousted by United Sabah Party (PBS). The party then effected a merger with USNO to form the Sabah chapter of the Peninsular-based United Malays National Organisation (UMNO). USNO's president Tun Mustapha Harun became Sabah UMNO's first president, while Harris became an adviser to the party.

Election results

See also 
:Category:Sabah People's United Front politicians

References

Defunct political parties in Sabah
1976 establishments in Malaysia
1991 disestablishments in Malaysia
Political parties established in 1976
Political parties disestablished in 1991